Khairpur(Sindhi and ) is a city and the capital of the Khairpur District of Sindh.

History

The Talpur dynasty was established in 1783 by Mir Fateh Ali Khan, who declared himself the first Rais, or ruler of Sindh, after defeating the Kalhoras at the Battle of Halani.

The death of Mir Sohrab Khan Talpur, founder of the Khairpur branch abdicated power to his eldest son Mir Rustam 'Ali Khan, in 1811.

Rustam's youngest half brother, 'Ali Murad, strengthened his hand by signing a treaty with the British in 1832, in which he secured recognition as the independent ruler of Khairpur in exchange for surrendering control of foreign relations to the British in 1838, as well as use of Sindh's roads and the Indus River.  

Rustam ruled until 1842, when abdicated in favor of his youngest brother Mir Ali Murad. Ali Murad helped the British in 1845-7 during the Turki campaign, but was later accused of plotting against the British in 1851–2, and so was stripped of his lands in upper Sindh by the British East India Company. As a result, the remaining land under his control consisted mostly of Khairpur city, and its immediate environs. During the 1857 Sepoy Mutiny, Ali Murad sided which the British, and prevented rebels from seizing the Shikarpur jail and treasury. He regained the favour of the British, and in 1866, the British promised to recognize any future successors as rightful rulers of Khairpur.

Ali Murad's eldest son had predeceased him, and so he was succeeded by his second son, Mir Faiz Muhammad Khan, who ruled until his death 1909. He was in turn succeeded by his son, Mir Sir Imam Bakhsh Khan Talpur, who aided the British war effort during World War I, and was thus awarded the honorary title Lieutenant-Colonel in 1918. He died in 1921, and was succeeded by His Highness Mir Ali Nawaz Khan. Under his rule, the feudal Cherr system of forced labour was abolished, while new canals were laid for irrigation.

Geography
Khairpur district is located in north-eastern Sindh and is bounded on the north by Shikarpur and Sukkur, on the east by India, on the south by Sanghar and Shaheed Benzeerabad and on the west by Larkana and Noshero Feroz. The district lies from 680 10’ to 700 10’ east longitude and 260 9’ to 270 42’ north Latitude.

Politics 
Politically, the city of Khairpur have been dominated by the Pakistan People's Party (PPP) since the era of 1970s. Excluding the exceptional occassions, where other parties had also left mark of their victory now or then but more or less the city have been represented by the MNAs belonging PPP in the Provincial and National Assembly.

The National Assembly 
The city is represented by the 1 MNA in the federal legislature since the remapping of the constituencies during 2018 Elections.

The Provincial Assembly

Climate
Khairpur has a hot desert climate (Köppen climate classification BWh), characterised by extremely hot and hazy summers with warm winters. Khairpur is known for its extremely hot summers, and was described as the hottest city in British India. Wind speed is low throughout the year, and sunshine is abundant. Summer temperatures regularly surpass . Dry heat is experienced starting April to early June until the Monsoon season starts to arrive. Monsoons in Khairpur are not very wet, but bring high dew points, resulting in high heat indices. Monsoons recede by September, but it is not until late October that the short lived autumn season is experienced before the onset of the region's cool winters.

Demographics
At the 1998 census, the population of the city of Khairpur was 102,188 having increased from 61,447 at the 1981 census. The city had an estimated population of 127,857 in 2006.

Education
There are following Colleges and Universities in Khairpur

 Khairpur Medical College KMC, Khairpur Mirs
 Pir Abdul Qadir Shah Jeelani Institute of Medical Sciences, Khairpur Mirs
 Shah Abdul Latif University, Khairpur Mirs
 IBA-Institute of Emerging Technologies, SIBAU Campus Khairpur
 Mehran University College Of Engineering And Technology SZAB Campus Khairpur, 
 The Benazir Bhutto Shaheed University of Technology & Skill Development, Khairpur Mirs,
 Khairpur College of Agricultural Engineering and Technology (KCAET) at Khairpur,
 Pak-Turk Maarif International Schools and Colleges Khairpur Campus ,
 IBA Community College Khairpur ,
 Superior Science College Khairpur Mirs ,
 Khairpur Women College Khairpur ,

See also

References

Further reading

External links

 Khairpur diaries: Where women earn and women rule 
 The golden harvest of Khairpur by Zofeen Ebrahim

Populated places in Sindh
Khairpur District